C. Richard (Dick) Tracy is an American biologist, a professor of biology at the University of Nevada, Reno.

Tracy earned bachelor's and master's degrees in biology at California State University, Northridge in 1966 and 1968, and then moved to the University of Wisconsin–Madison, where he earned a Ph.D. in zoology in 1972. After postdoctoral studies in Madison, he held a faculty position at Colorado State University from 1974 to 1995, when he moved to the University of Nevada, Reno. In 1980, Tracy visited the University of Washington in Seattle as a Guggenheim Fellow.

Tracy's research includes physiological ecology and biophysical ecology, as well as population biology and conservation biology, largely of reptiles and amphibians. His modeling research on the biophysical ecology of amphibians is considered foundational to our understanding of the ways in which amphibians interact with their physical environments. He has also conducted research on reptilian herbivores including Galapagos Land Iguana, Chuckwallas, and the federally listed desert tortoise. He has served on the desert tortoise recovery team, and chaired the assessment committee for the U.S. government's desert tortoise recovery plan.

Education

He received a B.A. in 1966 in biology from the California State University, Northridge. He received an  M.S. in 1968 in biology from California State University, Northridge. He received a Ph.D. in 1972 in zoology from the University of Wisconsin-Madison

From 1974 to 1995 Tracy was a member of the faculty at Colorado State University. He has taught at the University of Wisconsin, the University of Washington, the University of Puerto Rico, and Pepperdine University. Tracy has also taught at the biological stations administered by the University of Nebraska, Colorado State University, and the University of Michigan. He has served as major professor for 45 graduate students and 13 postdocs. Twenty-four of his Ph.D. students and postdocs have become professors at colleges and universities all over the world, and seven are scientists in the U.S. Geological Service. He maintains a diverse research program including pure and applied projects in physiology, ecology, and conservation biology that has resulted in more than 170 publications. Several projects incorporate principles, data, and analyses into strategies for preserving sensitive biological resources and for conservation planning.

The lizard species Liolaemus dicktracyi is named after him.

Honors

Fellow, John Simon Guggenheim Foundation
Fellow, American Association for the Advancement of Science
Distinguished Scholar, Pepperdine University
University Fellow, University of Wisconsin

Professional society memberships
American Association for the Advancement of Science [Fellow]
American Society of Ichthyologists and Herpetologists
American Society of Naturalists
Desert Tortoise Council
Ecological Society of America
Herpetologists’ League
International Iguana Society
Order of Sigma Xi
Society of Conservation Biologists
Society for Integrative and Comparative Biology
Society for the Study of Amphibians and Reptiles

References

External links
Personal web site

Living people
California State University, Northridge alumni
University of Wisconsin–Madison College of Letters and Science alumni
Colorado State University faculty
University of Nevada, Reno faculty
Fellows of the American Association for the Advancement of Science
1943 births
21st-century American biologists